Mack Damon (born December 22, 1972 in Independence, Missouri), is a record producer and recording engineer based in San Antonio, Texas. Originally a musician at an early age, he has also worked as:
a touring musician, a session musician, recording engineer, radio DJ, arranger, studio manager,
record producer, recording studio owner, and Vice President of Label Operations.

Damon attended the University of North Texas where he was introduced to the technology of recording and computers. While at the university he assisted teaching MUAG1217, an introductory course in electronic music. After a few semesters at UNT, Mack continued performing with bands, and went on to work a recording job at Oh So Good! productions.

In 1995, Mack and his boss, Dub Hankins, built the Rhapsody Street Studios facility, and Mack produced and engineered 11 full-length releases in the first 2 years. After a renovation and expansion, Mack moved into urban/rap/hip hop production and completed 14 releases in the following 18-month period.

In 1999, Damon started teaching audio engineering part-time, and worked with local school districts to offer high-school students a chance to work in a real recording studio environment. In addition, adult community-ed programs have been built around his lectures.

Also in 1999, Mack Damon began showing his photography to other artists, and eventually became a prolific photographer of musicians, documenting the recording process, and preparing images for marketing materials. His photography work has appeared in national print publications, on the web, and on TV.

Mack Damon served as the president of the Texas Music Coalition for two terms, starting in 2004.

In 2007, Damon worked with Texan singer-songwriter Laura Marie to produce her debut solo album, Drawn. They collaborated again in 2010 on the follow-up EP, Last of the Ones.

Commercial success
In 2003, Mack put together a group of investors and bought Rhapsody Street Studios.

In 2003 Damon's production and engineering work on the Frijoles Romanticos self-titled CD was nominated twice (on two separate albums) for Tejano Album of the year (category 63) in the American Grammy awards, and once for Tejano album of the year in the Latin Grammy awards.

Mack has produced, recorded, or engineered a number of commercially successful names: Vicki Carr, Bun B, Stone Cold Steve Austin, Mystikal, Lil Wayne, the Broadway cast of Jesus Christ Superstar, Baby Bash, Laura Canales, Bobby Pulido, and more.

His client list includes: Priority Records, MTV, Universal Records, EMI, Warner Music Group, WWE, Microsoft (Xbox Division), General Motors, GlaxoSmithKline, Chrysler, National Association of Broadcasters (NAB), Augsburg Fortress Publishing, and more.

References

External links
Mack Damon Website
Stone Creek Sound Website

American audio engineers
Living people
Record producers from Missouri
1972 births
People from Independence, Missouri
University of North Texas alumni